Vista Gaúcha is a municipality in the state of Rio Grande do Sul, Brazil.

Vista Gaúcha is located in the northeast of the province, 480 km from the capital, Porto Alegre.

The population of the municipality was 2,855 people, according to the IBGE Demographic estimate of 2020.

Its area is 90.02 km², comprising .033% of the province, 0.0157% of the region, and  0.001% of the country.

Its IDH is .0784 per the Atlas de Desenvolvimento Humano/PNUD (2000).

References

External links
Official site

Municipalities in Rio Grande do Sul